Cooper Spur ski area is a ski area located on northeast Mount Hood, Oregon, United States. The resort has one double chair ski lift serving ten runs, and a vertical drop of 110 meters (350 ft).

Cooper Spur Mountain Resort has  of forest on which condos, log cabins, a restaurant, and a hotel are located.

Expansion 
In the summer of 2001, Cooper Spur was purchased by an affiliate of Mount Hood Meadows named Meadows North LLC, and announced its intention to develop the Cooper Spur area as a year round destination resort with additional lifts, runs, and accommodation.  A July 18, 2001 proposal included developing a golf course, 450 housing units, a conference center, ice rink, swimming pool, amphitheater, shopping mall, and other developments.  The development was opposed by groups which favor preserving and expanding wilderness areas of northern Mount Hood.  Other concerns include potentially disrupting a key elk migration route, watershed disruption for two thousand nearby residents, and deforestation.

A controversial land swap was concluded with Hood River County by Meadows North LLC which increased the acreage adjacent to Cooper Spur owned by Meadows North LLC.

In the summer of 2002, the decades-old T-bar lift was replaced with a double chair, and excavation work created a tubing area.

The proposal became a provision of House Bill 5025 [109th] (Mount Hood Stewardship Legacy Act) and passed the House, but expired without senate approval. According to a GAO assessment, the value of lands were not appraised equivalently and probably not fairly.

See also 
List of ski areas and resorts in the United States#Oregon

References

External links 
 Cooper Spur Resort - Official Website

Buildings and structures in Hood River County, Oregon
Ski areas and resorts in Oregon
Mount Hood
Mount Hood National Forest
Tourist attractions in Hood River County, Oregon